Rob van Sonsbeek (born 22 August 1993) is a Dutch professional footballer who currently plays as a forward.

External links
 Voetbal International profile 

1993 births
Living people
Dutch footballers
RKC Waalwijk players
Eerste Divisie players
Footballers from North Brabant
Association football forwards
Sportspeople from Oss
21st-century Dutch people